Sarah Rose Karr (born November 13, 1984) is an American former child actress.

Karr is best known for her roles in the movies Beethoven and Beethoven's 2nd as Emily Newton (the youngest daughter of the characters played by Charles Grodin and Bonnie Hunt), and Kindergarten Cop (1990), where she played a pupil of the kindergarten teacher Arnold Schwarzenegger. As a very short cameo, she also appeared as a young Annie Banks in the film Father of the Bride.

Karr also appeared in multiple television soap operas.

Filmography

References

External links

1984 births
Living people
21st-century American actresses
Actresses from California
American child actresses
American film actresses
New College of Florida alumni